The 2015 SpongeBob SquarePants 400 was a NASCAR Sprint Cup Series race held on May 9, 2015, ending shortly after midnight on May 10, 2015 at Kansas Speedway in Kansas City, Kansas. Contested over 267 laps on the 1.5 mile (2.4 km) asphalt speedway, it was the 11th race of the 2015 NASCAR Sprint Cup season. Jimmie Johnson won the race, his third of the season. Kevin Harvick finished second. Dale Earnhardt Jr. finished third. Jeff Gordon and Joey Logano rounded out the top five.

Joey Logano won the pole for the race. He led 29 laps on his way to a fifth-place finish. Martin Truex Jr. led 95 laps in the first of four straight races in which he led the most laps on his way to a ninth-place finish. The race had 16 lead changes among ten different drivers, as well as nine caution flag periods for 49 laps. There was one red flag period for two hours, 16 minutes and 30 seconds for heavy rain.

This was the 73rd career victory for Jimmie Johnson, third at Kansas Speedway and sixth at the track for Hendrick Motorsports. This win moved Johnson up to third in the points standings. Chevrolet left Kansas with a 44-point lead over Ford in the manufacturer standings.

The SpongeBob SquarePants 400 was carried by Fox Sports on the cable/satellite Fox Sports 1 network for the American television audience. The radio broadcast for the race was carried by the Motor Racing Network and Sirius XM NASCAR Radio.

Report

Background

Kansas Speedway is a  tri-oval race track in Kansas City, Kansas. It was built in 2001 and it currently hosts two annual NASCAR race weekends. The Verizon IndyCar Series also raced at here until 2011. The speedway is owned and operated by the International Speedway Corporation.

Kevin Harvick entered Kansas with a 40-point lead over Martin Truex Jr. after a fourth-place finish at Talladega. Jimmie Johnson entered 52 back following a runner-up finish the week before at Talladega. Joey Logano entered 59 back. Dale Earnhardt Jr. entered 75 back after winning the previous week at Talladega.

Entry list
The entry list for the SpongeBob SquarePants 400 was released on Monday, May 4 at 2:52 p.m. Eastern time. Forty-four cars were entered for the race. Erik Jones, who drove in relief of Denny Hamlin at the 2015 Food City 500 at Bristol Motor Speedway, made his official Sprint Cup Series debut in the No. 18 Joe Gibbs Racing Toyota. Joey Gase returned to the No. 32 Go FAS Racing Ford after Bobby Labonte drove it the previous race at Talladega Superspeedway. Ty Dillon made his first Cup start since the 2015 Daytona 500 in the No. 33 Hillman-Circle Sport LLC Chevrolet. Brett Moffitt returned to the No. 34 Front Row Motorsports Ford that he drove in Las Vegas and Phoenix. David Ragan moved to the No. 55 Michael Waltrip Racing Toyota after driving the No. 18 Toyota the last nine races.

Practice

First practice

Final practice
It’s pretty cool to be fastest in practice. I know it’s only practice, but it’s still pretty cool. … There’s a lot of great race car drivers. It’s just really an honor to be fastest this practice.”

Qualifying

I came off Turn 4 and I didn’t know how to go faster than that. … It was a great run, our fourth pole of the season. We have a fast car and I’m excited.” “I just couldn’t quite find the speed in the last round,” Martin Truex Jr. said. “So, the guys did a good job and we have a good starting spot for tomorrow night. This track has been good to me and hopefully we can do better than we’ve been doing. It’s been good.” “We just got a little better speed in our car and this racetrack has been pretty good for us,” said Greg Biffle, who became the first Roush Fenway Racing driver to make a final round of qualifying this season. “We barely made the first round and barely made the second and then I just drove it – over drove it. I just said I was going to go for it.” “It would make our life so much easier starting up front and having a good pit stall pick,” Jimmie Johnson said. “Middle of the pack……we will fire our way through there and grind it out like we always do and try and I am sure get a great finish out of it. But we know we need to get better on Fridays.” Brendan Gaughan failed to qualify for the race.

Qualifying results

Race

First half

Start
The race was scheduled to start at 7:46 p.m., but the threat of weather moved the start time up to 7:36. The race started at 7:39 when Joey Logano led the field to the green flag. Going into turn 3, Jimmie Johnson got loose and about took out teammate Dale Earnhardt Jr. He was saved by the first caution of the race flew on lap eight for a two car wreck on the backstretch and turn 4. Exiting turn 2, Jeb Burton had a left-front flat and spun out on the backstretch, however at that point the race stayed green. Teammate J. J. Yeley spun and made contact with the wall in turn 4, which caused the caution.

The race restarted on lap 13. Alex Bowman dropped to the apron on the front stretch for electrical issues that dropped him to 42nd. The second caution of the race flew on lap 26. This was a scheduled competition caution. Most of the leaders took just two tires on this stop.

Threat of rain
The race restarted on lap 30. Kurt Busch went ahead of Logano in turn 3 and took the lead on lap 31. Teammate Kevin Harvick passed him in turn 1 to take the lead on lap 51. Martin Truex Jr. took the lead on lap 58. He hit pit road on lap 79 to pit. This handed the lead to Brad Keselowski. He just about missed pit road trying to enter and handed the lead to Matt Kenseth. He ducked onto pit road on lap 82 and handed the lead to rookie teammate Erik Jones. The lead cycled back to Martin Truex Jr. on lap 84. Michael McDowell was tagged for speeding and served a drive-through penalty.

The third caution of the race flew on lap 95 for a one car spin on the front stretch. Exiting turn 4, Jeb Burton got loose and spun down through the grass. Dale Earnhardt Jr. got back on the lead lap being the first car a lap down. Despite having just been on pit road, all of the lead lap cars pitted. Most took just two tires. Joey Logano was tagged for his crew being over the wall too soon. He was forced to restart from the tail-end of the field. Just before the race was to restart, rain started pouring and the race was red flagged on lap 99. Lightning in the area forced the spotters, camera people and fans to get to cover. The red flag lasted for two hours, 15 minutes and 30 seconds.

Restart
The drivers were called back to their cars at 10:30 p.m. The engines were re-fired at 10:58. The red flag was lifted and the cars rolled off pit road at 11:00. The race restarted on lap 108. The fourth caution of the race flew on lap 118 for a one car spin on the front stretch. Exiting turn 4, David Ragan got loose and spun through the grass. He came to a rest on the race logo in the middle of the front stretch. Brad Keselowski opted not to pit and took the lead.

The race restarted on lap 128. The fifth caution of the race flew on lap 131 for a multi-car wreck exiting turn 2. Matt Kenseth got sideways after suffering a flat left-front tire exiting 2 and was able to save it. Tony Stewart, trying to avoid Kenseth, got turned by Brett Moffitt into the wall.

Second half

Halfway
The race restarted on lap 135. Brad Keselowski surrendered the lead on lap 164 to pit and handed it to Martin Truex Jr. He ducked onto pit road on lap 176. This handed the lead to Carl Edwards. The sixth caution of the race flew on lap 184 for a single car wreck in turn 3. Going through turn 3, Clint Bowyer came down on Ricky Stenhouse Jr. and spun out. He was tagged again by Stenhouse who was trying to avoid hitting him further and spun around even more.

The race restarted with 77 laps to go. The seventh caution of the race flew for Erik Jones hitting the wall in the tri-oval. Exiting turn 4, his car got loose. He overcorrected and turned head first into the wall. Jones took the car to the garage. “I learned a lot about racing upfront and racing these guys,” Jones said later on Fox Sports 1. “I just got loose off 4 and lost it. It’s my fault. I’m ready to do another one. I hope we get a shot at it.”

Fourth quarter
The race restarted with 67 laps to go. Denny Hamlin suffered damage on the restart and pitted to repair it. He crashed in turn 1 and brought out the eighth caution with 60 laps to go. “I think we blew a left-front tire,” Hamlin told FOX Sports 1. He was unhappy with how long it took for NASCAR to throw a caution. “I blew it off of Turn 4, spun out, hit the wall at the start-finish line. I keep spinning, keep hitting the wall and I can’t figure out why everyone is still coming at 200 (mph). I look and the green light is on. They didn’t throw a caution until seven seconds after I wrecked. Luckily no one hit us in the door.” Kyle Larson exited pit road with the lead.

The race restarted with 55 laps to go. Kevin Harvick took back the lead with 54 laps to go. The ninth caution of the race flew with twelve laps to go when Stenhouse Jr. slammed the wall in turn 2. Jimmie Johnson opted not to pit when Harvick did under caution and assumed the lead. Paul Menard was tagged for an uncontrolled tire and forced to drop to the tail-end of the field for the restart.

Final laps
After waiving the restart with seven to go, the race restarted with six laps to go. Jimmie Johnson held off a hard charging Kevin Harvick for his 73rd career victory.

Post-race

Driver comments
“It was a long hard night of racing and fighting for track position,” Johnson said. “Once we got up front, we were able to hang on for the final eight or nine laps, whatever it was.” Martin Truex Jr. finished ninth after leading a race high 95 laps. “Yeah, definitely not the finish we wanted, obviously, but proud of the guys for the weekend we had, just had good speed all weekend, brought a brand new car here and just proud of that,” Truex Jr. said. “It's kind of disappointing, but at the same time proud of the way we ran, and I think it's something we can build off of. We should have either stayed out or took new tires. We probably did the worst thing you could have done there with just staying out and getting gas only, because we ended up being the last guy with no tires. Everybody else behind us had two and they ate us up on the restart. If we'd have taken two, we probably would have come out sixth, been in a pretty good position.”

Race results

Race statistics
16 lead changes among 10 different drivers
9 cautions for 49 laps; 1 red flag for 2 hours, 15 minutes and 30 seconds
Time of race: 3 hours, 11 minutes, 50 seconds
Average speed: 
Jimmie Johnson took home $243,726 in winnings

Race awards
 Coors Light Pole Award: Joey Logano (28.067)
 3M Lap Leader: Martin Truex Jr. (95 laps)
 American Ethanol Green Flag Restart Award: Kevin Harvick (30.322)
 Duralast Brakes "Bake In The Race" Award: Joey Logano
 Freescale "Wide Open": Dale Earnhardt Jr.
 Ingersoll Rand Power Move: Jeff Gordon (8 positions)
 MAHLE Clevite Engine Builder of the Race: Hendrick Engines, #4
 Mobil 1 Driver of the Race: Martin Truex Jr. (131.1 driver rating)
 Moog Steering and Suspension Problem Solver of The Race: Jimmie Johnson (crew chief Chad Knaus (0.650))
 NASCAR Sprint Cup Leader Bonus: No winner: rolls over to $80,000 at next event
 Sherwin-Williams Fastest Lap: Kyle Larson (Lap 203, 28.857)
 Sunoco Rookie of The Race: Matt DiBenedetto

Media

Television
Fox Sports covered their fifth race at Kansas Speedway. Mike Joy, Larry McReynolds and Darrell Waltrip had the call in the booth for the race. Jamie Little, Chris Neville and Matt Yocum handled the pit road duties for the television side. Due to a Major League Baseball game running long on Fox Sports 1, the first 22 minutes of the broadcast was shown on Fox News Channel.  The race switched back over to Fox Sports 1 as intended when the ballgame was over.

Radio
MRN had the radio call for the race, which was simulcast on Sirius XM NASCAR Radio. Joe Moore, Jeff Striegle and Rusty Wallace called the race in the booth when the field was racing through the tri-oval. Dave Moody called the race from a billboard outside of turn 2 when the field was racing through turns 1 and 2. Kurt Becker called the race from a billboard outside of turn 3 when the field was racing through turns 3 and 4. Alex Hayden, Winston Kelley and Steve Post worked pit road for MRN.

Standings after the race

Drivers' Championship standings

Manufacturers' Championship standings

Note: Only the first sixteen positions are included for the driver standings.

References

SpongeBob SquarePants 400
SpongeBob SquarePants 400
SpongeBob SquarePants 400
NASCAR races at Kansas Speedway
SpongeBob SquarePants